These are the results for the 28th edition of the Ronde van Nederland cycling race, which was held from August 15 to August 20, 1988. The race started in Groningen (Groningen) and finished after 859 kilometres in Gulpen (Limburg).

Stages

Final classification

External links
Wielersite Results

Ronde van Nederland
August 1988 sports events in Europe
1988 in road cycling
Ronde